United Nations Security Council resolution 1026, adopted unanimously on 30 November 1995, after recalling resolutions 982 (1995) and 998 (1995) on the United Nations Protection Force (UNPROFOR), the Council authorised an extension of its mandate until 31 January 1996.

The Council again welcomed the Dayton Agreement between Bosnia and Herzegovina, Croatia and the Federal Republic of Yugoslavia (Serbia and Montenegro) and stressed the need for all parties to abide by that agreement. The role of UNPROFOR was also praised.

Acting under Chapter VII of the United Nations Charter, the Security Council extended UNPROFOR's mandate until 31 January 1996 pending further action on the implementation of the Dayton Agreement. The Secretary-General Boutros Boutros-Ghali was invited to keep the Council informed on developments and submit reports on the implementation of the agreement and how it would affect the United Nations role.

See also
 Bosnian War
 Breakup of Yugoslavia
 Croatian War of Independence
 List of United Nations Security Council Resolutions 1001 to 1100 (1995–1997)
 Yugoslav Wars

References

External links
 
Text of the Resolution at undocs.org

 1026
 1026
1995 in Yugoslavia
1995 in Bosnia and Herzegovina
 1026
 1026
 1026
November 1995 events